A Steinke hood, named for its inventor, Lieutenant Harris Steinke, is a device designed to aid escape from a sunken submarine. In essence, it is an inflatable life jacket with a hood that completely encloses the wearer's head, trapping a bubble of breathable air. It is designed to assist buoyant ascent. The U.S. Navy replaced Steinke hoods on U.S. submarines with escape suits called Submarine Escape Immersion Equipment in the late 2000s.

See also

References
 Steinke Hood Fundamentals: Part I and Part II (note that the string "flash" in those URIs does not refer to Adobe's Flash, but rather is an acronym for "Factual Lines About Submarine Hazards.")
Steinke Hood 

Submarine rescue equipment
Military equipment introduced in the 1960s